The 2021 National Women Football Championship was the 13th edition of the National Women Football Championship, the top-tier of women's association football in Pakistan. It was held in Karachi from 8 March to 3 April 2021. All matches in the group stage were held at the KMC and KPT stadiums with the latter scheduled to hold the finals. The Aga Khan Gymkhana held matches of the development stage. Pakistan Army were the defending champions, having won the 2019–20 National Women Football Championship.

On 27 March 2021, following the takeover of the PFF House from PFF Normalization Committee (NC) by the Ashfaq Shah-led group, the Championship was cancelled with only the group stage completed. The development stage tournament was also cancelled by the PFF NC. However, the Ashfaq Shah-led group continued the tournament, but due to the boycott of some of the teams, the tournament was cancelled after the quarterfinals on 1 April 2021.

Format
The championship was divided into two parts: the main tournament and a development stage tournament. The main tournament consisted of group stage matches with the top two teams from each group moving forward to the knockouts. The development stage tournament featured the remaining three teams from each group in a separate knockout tournament.

There were eight referees in this tournament, with one of them being a woman.

Awards
The prize pool for this championship was PKR 3.2 million. It was to be divided into team and individual awards. The monetary awards were as follows:

Team
 Winner: Rs. 1 million 
 Runner-up: Rs. 750,000 
 Third-place: Rs. 500,000
 Development stage winners: Rs. 50,000

Individual
Total prize money for players, coaches and referees was Rs. 925,000.

Teams
Initially, a total of 20 teams were set to participate in the tournament. However, due to differences on the grant allocation, Model Town W.F.C. pulled out, leaving 19 teams in the field.

 Diya W.F.C.
 F.C. Karachi
 Gilgit W.F.C.
 Hazara Girls F.A.
 Hazara Quetta F.A.
 Higher Education Commission (HEC)
 Highlanders F.C.
 Jafa Soccer Academy
 Karachi United
 Karachi W.F.C.
 Masha United
 Model Town W.F.C. (withdrew)
 Mohsin Gillani W.F.C.
 MUK W.F.C.
 Nawanshehr United F.C.
 Pakistan Army(TH)
 Riaz Kamil FC
 Sialkot City W.F.C.
 WAPDA
 Young Rising Stars Layyah

Notes TH = Championship title holders

Debutants 
Seven teams including Masha United, Hazara Quetta Football Academy and Hazara Girls Football Academy made their debuts. For the second time in the championship's history, foreign players were included as part of a local team, with Masha United signing four players from Nepal. Some players were very young, such as those of Hazara Girls F.A., who were all under 15 years old, with one of them being 11.

Covid-19

Mitigation protocol
The championship was being conducted with a few protocols including mandatory wearing of masks, temperature screening and a ban on handshakes and team scrums. However, there was no testing of the players or officials including the foreign players who joined Masha United in Karachi.

Suspension of matches
On 15 March, PFF announced that all group 'B' matches were suspended following a positive test of a Karachi United player.
All players and officials from Karachi United as well as all those from teams having first and second contact i.e. Karachi WFC, Sialkot City WFC and HEC underwent covid test. On 19 March, it was reported that Karachi WFC and HEC had returned negative tests while results of the other two teams were still waited on. Matches involving the former two teams and the remaining 5th team, Masha United, are set to resume on 20 March 2021. The other two teams will not be involved in any matches until all members return negative test results.

Broadcasting
Like the previous championship, this year's tournament was streamed live on MyCujoo.

AFC Women’s Football Day
The championship opened on 8 March 2021 with a celebration of AFC Women's Football Day at KPT Stadium. Around 50 schoolgirls were introduced to the basis of football by members of the national team including captain Hajra Khan.

Knockout stage and cancellation
The top two teams from each group moved into the knockout stage. The remaining teams moved to the development stage tournament.

However, on 27 March 2021, the championship was cancelled. No official reason was given, but the decision took place after the Pakistan Football Federation's office in Lahore was attacked and people inside held hostage by its former president, Syed Ashfaq Hussain Shah, and his group.

As the NWFC was cancelled on 27 March 2021, the knockout stages which were to begin on 28 March 2021 were not held by PFF. The Ashfaq Shah-led group, however, decided to complete the tournament by forming a new organizing committee.

In the quarterfinals, Diya W.F.C. gave a walkover to Masha United in protest, while Highlanders, Karachi United, and WAPDA won their respective fixtures. The tournament was cancelled following more protests on 1 April 2021.

Group stage

Group A

Group B

Group C

Group D

Development stage tournament

Format 
The development stage tournament commenced from 26 March 2021. This tournament included the 11 teams which did not qualify for the knockout stages. Third-placed teams as well as the two best fourth-placed teams from the four groups directly qualified to the quarterfinals, while the rest of the eliminated teams faced each other in the pre-quarterfinals. These matches were scheduled to be held at the Aga Khan Gymkhana ground, and only the pre-quarterfinals took place before the tournament was cancelled. The following teams were included:

 FC Karachi
 Gilgit WFC
 Hazara Quetta Football Academy
 Higher Education Commission
 Karachi WFC
 Mohsin Gillani WFC
 MUK FC
 Nawanshehr United FC
 Riaz Kamil
 Sialkot City WFC
 Young Rising Stars Layyah

Matches

References

External links
 Live streaming

National Women Football Championship seasons
W1
Pakistan
Pakistan